Carlton Fairweather (born 22 September 1961) is an English former professional footballer and the former manager of FA WSL club Sunderland Ladies.

Playing career
Fairweather began his career in Non-League football with Dulwich Hamlet, Bromley and Tooting & Mitcham United where his performances attracted the attentions of Wimbledon.

He signed for the Dons in 1984 and made his debut on New Years Day 1985 against Oldham Athletic. Early in his career at the club he had loan spells at Porin Pallotoverit and Koparit in Finland before establishing himself as a regular in the Wimbledon side. He went on to make 138 league appearances for the club, scoring 26 goals as they established themselves as a First Division club and being founders members of the new FA Premier League in 1992. His best season was the 1986–87 campaign, where he played 23 times in the league and scored eight goals in their first campaign as a First Division club, finishing an impressive sixth and actually leading the table in early September. The highlight of Wimbledon's remarkable success story came at the end of the 1987–88 when they reached the FA Cup final and achieved a shock 1–0 win over Liverpool. However, a broken leg meant that Fairweather was not in the squad for that game, although he did appear 21 times in the league prior to his injury and scored four goals to help achieve a seventh-place finish. By the end of his time at Wimbledon, he had become the club's "forgotten man", failing to make a single league appearance in his final season and played just 11 times collectively in the two seasons before that.

 He signed for Carlisle United in 1993 after falling out of favour at Wimbledon. He left Carlisle after only 12 league appearances (1 goal) to transfer to Golden F.C. He moved to American soccer in 1996 with New York Fever, before going on to represent Greek Americans Soccer Club and Connecticut Wolves.

Subsequent career
After retirement Fairweather returned to Wimbledon as a full-time coach in the club's youth academy and managed both the Under-17 and Under-18 teams before being promoted to Reserve team manager. He left Wimbledon to take over as Reserve team manager at Crystal Palace before taking up a position as a community coach with Sunderland A.F.C. and working as a coach at Sunderland High School. In addition he has also coached as part of the US Olympic Development Programme. He has also played for the "masters" team representing AFC Wimbledon.

In December 2014, Fairweather was appointed head coach of newly promoted FA WSL 1 club Sunderland Ladies. He left the club in early 2017 however.

References

1961 births
Living people
Footballers from Camberwell
English footballers
Association football wingers
Dulwich Hamlet F.C. players
Bromley F.C. players
Tooting & Mitcham United F.C. players
Wimbledon F.C. players
FC Jazz players
Koparit players
Slough Town F.C. players
Carlisle United F.C. players
Sun Hei SC players
New York Fever players
Connecticut Wolves players
Greek American AA players
English Football League players
English football managers
Women's Super League managers
Sunderland A.F.C. non-playing staff
Expatriate footballers in Hong Kong
Black British sportsmen
English expatriate sportspeople in Hong Kong
English expatriate footballers
English expatriate sportspeople in the United States
Expatriate soccer players in the United States